Hyphercyna is a genus of moths of the family Crambidae. It contains only one species, Hyphercyna luedersi, is found in Central Asia.

References

Pyraustinae
Crambidae genera